Scaw'd Law is a hill in the Lowther Hills range, part of the Southern Uplands of Scotland. The Dumfries and Galloway-South Lanarkshire border runs along its summit, which is notable for having two similar rounded tops; the top 300m to the north is likely the true summit. Surrounded on most sides by tracks or roads, there are various routes to the summit, but the most frequent ascents are from Durisdeer or the Daer Reservoir.

Subsidiary SMC Summits

References

Mountains and hills of the Southern Uplands
Mountains and hills of Dumfries and Galloway
Donald mountains